Terence Lyons (14 February 1929 – 1986) was an English professional footballer who played as a winger. He played fifty matches in the Football League for Burnley and Bradford Park Avenue, before moving into non-league football with Weymouth.

References

1929 births
1986 deaths
English footballers
Association football midfielders
Burnley F.C. players
Bradford (Park Avenue) A.F.C. players
Weymouth F.C. players
English Football League players
Footballers from Bradford